The 2008 Malaysian GP2 Asia Series round was a GP2 Asia Series motor race held on 22 and 23 March 2008 at Sepang International Circuit in Sepang, Malaysia. It was the third round of the 2008 GP2 Asia Series. The race supported the 2008 Malaysian Grand Prix.

Classification

Qualifying

 Luca Filippi, Vitaly Petrov, Hiroki Yoshimoto and Jason Tahincioglu received five place grid penalty for disregarding yellow flags during free practice.

Feature race

Sprint race

Standings after the event 

Drivers' Championship standings

Teams' Championship standings

 Note: Only the top five positions are included for both sets of standings.

See also 
 2008 Malaysian Grand Prix
 2008 Malaysian Speedcar Series round

References

GP2 Asia Series
GP2 Asia